Artemis 4 (officially Artemis IV) is the fourth planned mission of NASA's Artemis program. The mission will launch four astronauts on a Space Launch System rocket and an Orion to the Lunar Gateway and the second lunar landing of the Artemis program.

Overview 
The main objective of the mission will be assembly of the Lunar Gateway. The mission will deliver the I-Hab habitat module, developed by the European Space Agency and the Japanese space agency JAXA, to the Gateway. The module will be docked with the first Gateway elements, the Power and Propulsion Element and Habitation and Logistics Outpost.

The astronauts will then board a Starship HLS docked to the station and descend to the lunar surface for a multi-day mission.

Artemis IV will also be the first flight of the Block 1B version of the Space Launch System, which will replace the Interim Cryogenic Propulsion Stage used on the first three Artemis missions with the more powerful Exploration Upper Stage. This upgrade increases the rocket's trans lunar injection capability from >27 metric tons, to >42 metric tons. It also allows the ability to co-manifest payloads onboard with the Orion spacecraft.

, Artemis IV is scheduled to launch no earlier than September 2028.

Crew 
ESA has indicated that their objective is that Artemis IV would be the first mission of an ESA astronaut to the Gateway.

Spacecraft

Space Launch System 
The Space Launch System is a super-heavy-lift launcher used to launch the Orion spacecraft from Earth to a trans-lunar orbit. This will be the first Artemis mission to use an SLS Block 1B rocket with an advanced Exploration Upper Stage for four upcoming missions until the proposed Artemis 9, which will use SLS Block 2 with advanced boosters.

Orion Multi-Purpose Crew Vehicle 
Orion is the crew transport vehicle used by all Artemis missions. It comprises the Orion Crew Module and the European Service Module and will transport the crew from Earth to the Gateway orbit, dock to the Gateway, deliver the I-Hab module to the Gateway, and return them back to Earth.

Gateway 

Gateway is a small modular space station to be established in Near-rectilinear halo orbit (NRHO) in late 2024. The first two Gateway elements (Power and Propulsion Element and the Habitation and Logistics Outpost) will launch together aboard a SpaceX Falcon Heavy and spend a year spiraling out to the near-rectilinear halo orbit around the moon prior to Artemis IV.

Human Landing System
Current Artemis IV mission plans call for use of the SpaceX Human Lander System Option B configuration to support the lunar landing and return to Gateway phase of the mission.

Mobile Launcher 2
The heavier total mass of the SLS Block 1B vehicle requires use of the Mobile Launcher-2 ground support equipment. Current development schedules and challenges experienced by the ML-2 contractor team in the design and delivery of the system have placed this GSE on the critical path from a schedule perspective. Delays to ML-2 availability for use will delay launch of the SLS Block 1B variant. The NASA Office of Inspectior General (OIG) estimates the earliest that ML-2 will be available for Artemis IV is November 2026.

References

External links 

2028 in spaceflight
Artemis program
Crewed missions to the Moon
Orion (spacecraft)
Space Launch System
2028 in the United States
Missions to the Moon
Crewed spacecraft
Future human spaceflights
Lunar Gateway
NASA spacecraft
Space stations